Memo is short for memorandum, a document or other communication.

Memo or The Memo may also refer to:

People
"Memo" is a frequent nickname for people named Guillermo.
 Memo Acevedo, Colombian-born Canadian-American jazz drummer, percussionist, composer, arranger, bandleader and educator
 Memo Benassi (1886–1957), Italian film actor
 Memo Gidley (born 1970), Mexican-American race car driver
 Guillermo Gonzalez (soccer) (born 1986), American soccer player
 Memo Gracida (born 1956), Mexican polo player
 Memo Luna (born 1930), Mexican retired baseball player
 Guillermo Ochoa (born 1985), Mexican soccer goalkeeper
 Mehmet Okur (born 1979), Turkish retired National Basketball Association player
 Memo Rojas (born 1981), Mexican race car driver
 Guillermo Valencia (footballer), Colombian football coach and former player
 Memo (footballer) (born 1988), Brazilian footballer 
 Memo (rower) (born 1995), Indonesian rower

Places
 Memo River, Venezuela
 Mêmo, a village in the Tibet Autonomous Region of China

Songs
"Memo", a 1978 song by Tonet
"The Memo", a 2000 song from the album Outbound by Stuart Hamm
"The Memo", a 2009 song by The Hard Lessons from Arms Forest
"Memo", a 2015 song by Years & Years
"Memo", from the 2016 album Slime Season 3 by Young Thug

MEMO
 Memo – Magazine of European Medical Oncology
 Middle East Monitor, a not-for-profit press monitoring organization founded in 2009
 Mouvement pour une école moderne et ouverte, an education-focused political party in Montreal, Canada
 MEMO, a specialization in electrical engineering that studies microwaves, electromagnetism and optoelectronics
 MEMO Multi-Perspective Enterprise Modelling, see Enterprise modelling

Other uses
 The Memorandum (also translated as The Memo), a 1965 play by Václav Havel
The Memo, a short film by Daheli Hall

See also
 MEMO model (wind-flow simulation), a model for wind flow simulation
 Memoization, a technique used primarily to speed up computer programs
Memorandum (disambiguation)

Lists of people by nickname